The following are notable people who were either born, raised, or have lived for a significant period of time in the American state of Kansas.

Academics and Nobel Prize laureates 

Milton S. Eisenhower (1899–1985), university president; Abilene
Wendell Johnson (1906–1965), psychologist and speech pathologist, author of The Monster Study; Roxbury
Jack S. Kilby (1923–2005), Nobel Prize winner in Physics; Great Bend
Solon Toothaker Kimball (1909–1982), anthropologist; Manhattan
Stanford Lehmberg (1931–2012), historian; McPherson
Norman Malcolm (1911–1990), philosopher; Selden
Deane Waldo Malott (1898–1996), president of Cornell University; Abilene
Abby Lillian Marlatt (1869–1943), home economics; Manhattan
Eric K. Meyer (born 1953), journalism professor and Pulitzer Prize nominee; Marion
M. Lee Pelton (born 1950), president of Willamette University; Wichita
John Brooks Slaughter (born 1934), college president and first African-American director of the National Science Foundation; Topeka
Vernon L. Smith (born 1927), Nobel Memorial Prize winner in Economics; Wichita
Earl Wilbur Sutherland Jr. (1915–1974), 1971 Nobel Prize winner in Physiology and Medicine; Burlingame
Donald Worster (born 1941), historian; Lawrence

Arts and literature

Artists 
Nina E. Allender (1873–1957), artist and women's suffrage cartoonist; Auburn
Grace Bilger (1907–2000), artist; Olathe
Grant Bond (born 1974), artist; Kansas City
Blackbear Bosin (1921–1980), Native American artist; Wichita
Gwendolyn Elizabeth Brooks (1917–2000), poet; Topeka
Bruce Conner (1933–2008), artist; McPherson
John Steuart Curry (1897–1946), artist; Winchester
Aaron Douglas (1900–1979), artist; Topeka
Randall Duell (1903–1992), architect and art director; Russell County
Edgar Heap of Birds (born 1954), artist; Wichita
Bruce Helander (born 1947), artist; Great Bend
Elizabeth Layton (1909–1993), artist; Wellsville
Evan Lindquist (born 1936), printmaker, Artist Laureate of Arkansas; Salina
Barbara Morgan (1900–1992), photographer; Buffalo, Kansas
Gordon Parks (1912–2006), photographer and film director; Fort Scott
Birger Sandzen (1871–1954), artist, art professor at Bethany College; Lindsborg
Gary Mark Smith (born 1956), photographer, studied at University of Kansas; Wichita
W. Eugene Smith (1918–1978), photographer; Wichita
Mort Walker (1923–2018), cartoonist, creator of Beetle Bailey and Hi and Lois comic strips; El Dorado

Authors 
Laura Abbot, author of Harlequin romance novels; Kansas City
Gwendolyn Brooks (1917–2000), author, poet; Topeka
William Burroughs (1914–1997), author; Lawrence
Don Coldsmith (1926–2009), author of Western fiction; Iola
Dorothy Canfield Fisher (1879–1958), author of children's books; Lawrence
Thomas Frank (born 1965), author and editor; Mission Hills
Clara H. Hazelrigg (1861–1937), author, educator, social reformer; Council Grove
Jane Heap (1883–1964), author and publisher; Topeka
Scott Heim (born 1966), author; Hutchinson
Langston Hughes (1902–1967), author and poet; Lawrence
William Inge (1913–1973), playwright; Independence
Bill James (born 1949), author; Mayetta
Bill Martin Jr. (1916–2004), children's author; Hiawatha
Fred Myton (1885–1955), screenwriter; Garden City
Kathy Patrick, author, founder of Pulpwood Queens Book Club; Eureka
Scott Phillips (born 1961), author; Wichita
Vance Randolph (1892–1980), folklorist; Pittsburg
Red Reeder (1902–1998), author and United States Army officer; Fort Leavenworth
Richard Rhodes (born 1937), author and historian; Kansas City
Lois Ruby, author of historic fiction; Lawrence
Damon Runyon (1880–1946), author; Manhattan
Mary Francis Shura (1923–1990), children's, romance and mystery author; Pratt
William Stafford (1914–1993), poet and pacifist; Hutchinson
Max Yoho (1934–2017), author; Colony

Dancers 
Clark Tippet (1954–1992), ballet; Parsons

Musicians

Athletics

Athletes 
A–F

Alvan Adams (born 1954), basketball; Lawrence
John H. Adams (1914–1995), jockey; Iola
Neil Allen (born 1958), baseball pitcher, pitching coach; Kansas City
David Arkin (born 1987), pro football player; Wichita
Elden Auker (1910–2006), baseball pitcher; Norcatur
Chase Austin (born 1989), NASCAR driver; Eudora
Chris Babb (born 1990), basketball player in the Israeli Basketball Premier League; Topeka
Ron Baker (born 1993), NBA player (New York Knicks); Utica and Scott City (born in Hays)
Thane Baker (born 1931), gold medalist at 1956 Summer Olympics, decathlon; Elkhart
Tony Barker (born 1968), football player; Wichita
Chris Barnes (born 1970), professional bowler; Topeka
James Bausch (1906–1974), gold medalist 1932 Summer Olympics; Garden Plain
Judy Bell (born 1936), member of World Golf Hall of Fame; Wichita
Matt Besler (born 1987), professional soccer player; Overland Park
B.H. Born (1932–2013), basketball player; Medicine Lodge
Clint Bowyer (born 1979), NASCAR driver; Emporia
George Brett (born 1953), baseball Hall of Famer; Mission Hills
Bryce Brown (born 1991), football player; Wichita
Orville Brown (1908–1981), pro wrestler, NWA champion; Sharon
Mildred Bliss Burke (1915–1989), pro wrestler, Professional Wrestling Hall of Fame; Coffeyville
Enos Cabell (born 1949), baseball player; Fort Riley
Veronica Campbell-Brown (born 1982), track and field athlete (Olympic and world champion); Great Bend
Antoine Carr (born 1961), basketball player
Willie Cauley-Stein (born 1993), professional basketball player Spearville
Larry Cheney (1886–1969), baseball pitcher; Belleville
Jack Christiansen (1928–1986), football Hall of Famer; Sublette
Tony Clark (born 1972), baseball player; Newton
Maliek Collins (born 1995), football player; Kansas City
Baron Corbin (born 1984), football player, WWE wrestler; Lenexa
Nolan Cromwell (born 1955), football player; Smith Center
Aaron Crow (born 1986), baseball player; Topeka
Glenn Cunningham (1909–1988), silver medalist, 1936 Olympic Games,1,500m run; Elkhart
Johnny Damon (born 1973), baseball player; Fort Riley
Eldon Danenhauer (1935–2021), football player; Clay Center
Darren Daulton (born 1962), baseball player; Arkansas City
Wantha Davis (1917–2012), jockey; Liberal
Joey Devine (born 1983), baseball player; Junction City
Lynn Dickey (born 1949), football player; Osawatomie
Andy Dirks (born 1986), baseball player; Burrton
Larry Drew (born 1958), basketball player and coach; Kansas City
Mark Duckens (born 1965), football player; Wichita
Brian Duensing (born 1983), baseball player; Marysville
Brody Eldridge (born 1987), football player; La Cygne
Tim Elliott (born 1986), mixed martial artist; Wichita
Maurice Evans (born 1978), basketball player; Wichita
Kyle Farnsworth (born 1976), baseball player; Wichita
Galen Fiss (1931–2006), football player; Johnson City 
Adrianna Franch (born 1990), soccer player (world champion); Salina
Scott Fulhage (born 1961), football player; Beloit

G–M

Andrew Gachkar (born 1988), football player; Overland Park
Kendall Gammon (born 1968), football player; Rose Hill
Tyson Gay (born 1982), track and field athlete (world champion); Great Bend
Maurice Greene (born 1974), track and field athlete (world and Olympic champion); Kansas City
Adrian Griffin (born 1974), basketball player and coach; Wichita
Geneo Grissom (born 1992), football player; Hutchinson
Andy Gruenebaum (born 1982), soccer player
Don Gutteridge (1912–2008), baseball player and manager; Pittsburg
Joe Hastings (born 1987), football player; Wichita
Tanner Hawkinson (born 1990), football player; McPherson
Mark Haynes (born 1958), football player; Kansas City
Ben Heeney (born 1992), football player; Hutchinson
Bobby Henrich (born 1938), baseball player; Lawrence
Don Hill (1904–1967), football player; Hiawatha
Shaun Hill (born 1980), football player; Parsons
Elon Hogsett (1903–2001), baseball player; Brownell
Lionel Hollins (born 1953), basketball player and coach; Arkansas City
Scott Huffman (born 1964), pole vaulter; Quinter
Damian Johnson (born 1962), football player; Great Bend
Walter Johnson (1887–1946), baseball Hall of Famer; Humboldt
Pete Kilduff (1893–1930), baseball player; Weir
Fred Kipp (born 1931), baseball pitcher; Piqua
Tonya Knight (born 1966), IFBB professional bodybuilder; Overland Park
Laurie Koehn (born 1982), WNBA player; Moundridge
Gene Krug (born 1955), baseball player; Garden City
Adam LaRoche (born 1979), baseball player; Fort Scott
Bobby Lashley (born 1976), professional wrestler for WWE; Junction City
Shalee Lehning (born 1987), WNBA player; Sublette
Martin Lewis (born 1975), NBA basketball player; Liberal
Danny Manning (born 1966), NBA basketball player; Lawrence
Harold Manning (1909–2003), Steeplechase world record holder and Olympian; Sedgwick
Rudy May (born 1944), baseball player; Coffeyville
Jon McGraw, professional football player; Riley
Archie "Hap" McKain (1911–1985), baseball player; Delphos
Peter Mehringer (1910–1987), Olympic gold medalist wrestler, pro football player; Kinsley
Brian Moorman (born 1976), football player; Sedgwick
Mike Morin (born 1991), baseball player; Leawood

N–Z

Marcio Navarro (born 1978), professional kickboxer and mixed martial artist; Wichita
Jordy Nelson (born 1985), football player; Leonardville
Terence Newman (born 1978), football player; Salina
Nicole Ohlde (born 1982), WNBA player; Clay Center
Antonio Orozco (born 1987), professional boxer; Garden City
Victor Ortiz (born 1987), professional boxer; Garden City
Bob Orton (1929–2006), professional wrestler; Kansas City
Bob Orton Jr. (born 1950), professional wrestler, WWE Hall of Fame; Kansas City
John Parrella (born 1969), professional football player; Topeka
Hal Patterson (1932–2011), professional football player; Larned
Jordan Phillips (born 1992), professional football player; Towanda
Joseph Randle (born 1991), professional football player; Wichita
Ronn Reynolds (born 1958), professional baseball player; Wichita
Dustin Richardson (born 1984), MLB pitcher; Newton
John Riggins (born 1949), football player, Pro Football Hall of Famer; Centralia
Brandon Rios (born 1986), professional boxer; Garden City
Lafayette Russell (1905–1978), football player, B-movie actor "Reb" Russell; Osawatomie
Johnny Rutherford (born 1938), race car driver; Coffeyville
Jim Ryun (born 1947), athlete and politician; Wichita
Barry Sanders (born 1968), football player, NFL Hall of Famer; Wichita
Melvin Sanders (born 1981), pro basketball player; Liberal
Wes Santee (1932–2010), NCAA cross country champion, track and field athlete; Ashland
Gale Sayers (1943–2020), NFL Hall of Famer; Wichita
Otto Schnellbacher (1923–2008), pro basketball and football player; Sublette
Ryan Schraeder (born 1988), professional football player; Wichita
Wayne Simien (born 1983), NCAA All-American, NBA basketball player; Leavenworth
Mark Simoneau (born 1977), professional football player; Smith Center
Marilynn Smith (1929–2019), professional golfer and LPGA co-founder; Topeka
Darren Sproles (born 1983), professional football player; Olathe
Bubba Starling (born 1992), professional baseball player; Gardner
Lee Stevens (born 1967), professional baseball player; Lawrence
Jackie Stiles (born 1978), WNBA basketball player; Claflin
Stewart "Smokey" Stover (born 1938), professional football player; McPherson
Darrell Stuckey (born 1987), professional football player; Kansas City
Tom Sturdivant (1930–2009), professional baseball player; Gordon
Steve Tasker (born 1962), NFL Pro Bowl MVP in 1993; Leoti (born in Smith Center
Luther Haden "Dummy" Taylor (1875–1958), baseball pitcher; Oskaloosa
Doug Terry (born 1968), pro football player; Liberal
Tommy Thompson (1916–1989), pro football player; Hutchinson
Joe Tinker (1880–1948), MLB shortstop, member of Baseball Hall of Fame; Muscotah
Blake Treinen (born 1988), professional baseball player; Osage City
Jerame Tuman (born 1976), pro football player; Liberal
Ron Warner (born 1975), professional football player; Independence
Earl Watson (born 1979), NBA basketball player; Kansas City
Tom Watson (born 1949), golfer, member of World Golf Hall of Fame; Stilwell
Mitch Webster (born 1959), MLB player; Larned
Kendra Wecker (born 1982), WNBA player; Marysville
Michael Wilhoite (born 1986), pro football player; Manhattan
Jess Willard (1881–1968), world heavyweight boxing champion, St. Clere; Pottawatomie County
Kamerion Wimbley (born 1983), professional football player; Wichita
Lynette Woodard (born 1959), basketball Hall of Famer; Wichita
Brad Ziegler (born 1979), baseball player; Pratt
John Zook (1947–2020), professional football player; Garden City

Coaches

Aviators and astronauts 

Walter Herschel Beech (1891–1950), aviator and aircraft designer; Wichita
Clyde Vernon Cessna (1879–1954), aviator and aircraft designer; Rago
Amelia Earhart (1897–1937), aviator; Atchison
Joe Engle (born 1932), astronaut; Chapman
Ronald Evans (1933–1990), astronaut; St. Francis
Daniel Forbes (1920–1948), United States Army Air Corps pilot; Carbondale
Steve Hawley (born 1951), astronaut; Salina
Donald Hudson (1895–1967), World War I flying ace; Topeka
Glenn L. Martin (1886–1955), aviation pioneer; Salina
Lloyd Carlton Stearman (1898–1975), aviator and aircraft designer; Wellsford

Businesspeople and inventors 

Philip Anschutz (born 1939), billionaire investor; Russell
Bion Barnett (1857–1958), co-founder of Barnett Bank; Hiawatha
Olive Ann Beech, chairwoman of Beech Aircraft Company; Wichita (born in Waverly)
Dan and Frank Carney (Dan born 1931, Frank 1938–2020), founders of Pizza Hut; Wichita
Walter Chrysler (1875–1940), founder of Chrysler Corporation; Wamego
William Coffin Coleman (1870–1957), founder of the Coleman Company; Wichita
David Dillon (born 1951), former CEO of Kroger; Hutchinson
Vic Edelbrock (1913–1962), automotive engineer; Eudora
David Green (born 1941), founder of Hobby Lobby; Emporia
James Harbord (1866–1947), president and chairman of the board of RCA; Manhattan
Hollis Dow Hedberg (1903–1988), president of Gulf Oil Company; Falun
William Wadsworth Hodkinson (1881–1971), pioneer film marketer and distributor; Independence
Carl Ice (born 1956), President of BNSF; Topeka
Omar Knedlik (1915–1989), inventor of the ICEE frozen drink; Barnes
Charles G. Koch (born 1935), CEO of Koch Industries; Wichita
David H. Koch (1940–2019), executive and politician; Wichita
Alan Mulally (born 1945), engineer, former president and CEO of the Ford Motor Company; Lawrence
Matthew K. Rose (born 1959), chairman and CEO of Burlington Northern Santa Fe Corp.; Salina
Harry F. Sinclair (1876–1956), founder of Sinclair Oil Company; Independence
Russell Stover (1888–1954), founder of Russell Stover Candies; Alton

Film, stage and television

Actors and performers

Directors 
Michael Almereyda (born 1960), film director; Overland Park
Steve Balderson (born 1975), film director; Wamego
Darren Lynn Bousman (born 1979), film director; Overland Park
Chris Buck (born 1960), film director, animator; Wichita
Eric Darnell (born 1960), director, writer, songwriter, animator; Prairie Village
Randall Duell (1903–1992), art director; Russell County
Alex Graves (born 1968), television director; El Dorado
Sherman Halsey, music video and television director; Independence
Martin and Osa Johnson (1884–1937 and 1894–1953), film pioneer, explorer; Chanute
Oscar Micheaux (1893–1951), film director; Great Bend
Gordon Parks (1912–2006), film director; Fort Scott
Richard Thorpe (1896–1991), film director; Hutchinson

Public figures

Journalists 
Frank Marshall Davis (1905–1987), journalist, poet, political and labor movement activist; Arkansas City
Steve Doocy (born 1956), co-host of Fox News's Fox & Friends; Abilene
Elizabeth Farnsworth (born 1943), television journalist; Topeka
William M. Gallagher (1923–1975), Pulitzer Prize-winning photojournalist; Hiawatha
Jane Grant (1892–1972), journalist who co-founded The New Yorker; Girard
E. W. Howe (1853–1937), author and newspaper editor; Atchison
Bill Kurtis (born 1940), television journalist; Independence
Jim Lehrer (1934–2020), television journalist; Wichita
Melissa McDermott (born 1960s), television news anchor for CBS's Up to the Minute; Wichita
Clementine Paddleford (1898–1967), journalist and food critic; Riley County
Eugene C. Pulliam (1889–1975), founder Central Newspapers, Inc.; Ulysses
Roy A. Roberts (1887–1967), newspaper editor; Muscotah
W. Eugene Smith (1918–1978), photojournalist; Wichita
John Cameron Swayze (1906–1995), television journalist; Wichita
Julius Wayland (1854–1912), newspaper editor, Appeal to Reason; Girard
William Allen White (1868–1944), author and newspaper editor; Emporia
Gene Wojciechowski, author, sportswriter and ESPN commentator; Salina

Politics and law

Military and national security

Religious 
William Bickerton (1815–1905), founder of the Church of Jesus Christ (Bickertonite) and the Zion Valley, Kansas, colony; St. John
Charles J. Chaput (born 1944), Archbishop, Roman Catholic Archdiocese of Denver; Concordia
Sheri L. Dew (born 1953), influential Latter-day Saint spokeswoman; Ulysses
Bart D. Ehrman (born 1955), New Testament scholar; Lawrence
Jerry Johnston (born 1959), Southern Baptist Convention evangelist and pastor; Overland Park
Emil Kapaun (1916–1951), Army chaplain Korean War, posthumous Medal of Honor recipient, Catholic martyr and sainthood candidate; Pilsen
Ron Kenoly (born 1944), musical worship leader; Coffeyville
Fred Phelps (1929–2014), leader of Westboro Baptist Church; Topeka
James Reeb (1927–1965), Unitarian minister beaten to death by segregationists in Selma, Alabama, during the Civil Rights Movement; Wichita
David Laurin Ricken (born 1954), bishop of Roman Catholic Diocese of Cheyenne; Dodge City
Michael Jarboe Sheehan (born 1939), Archbishop of Santa Fe; Wichita
M. Madeline Southard (1877–1967), Methodist minister and writer
John Joseph Sullivan (1920–2001), Bishop of Grand Island, Nebraska, and Kansas City-St. Joseph; Horton
Gerald B. Winrod (1900–1957), evangelical Christian and Nazi sympathizer; Wichita
Gordon Winrod (born 1926), Christian Identity minister; Hesston

Scientists and programmers

Others

Notable individuals

Notable historical figures not from Kansas but who participated in a significant event in Kansas 
John Brown (1800–1859), abolitionist; Osawatomie
Buffalo Bill Cody (1846–1917), buffalo hunter and showman; Leavenworth
Wyatt Earp (1848–1929), lawman; Wichita and Dodge City
Mary Tenney Gray (1833-1904), known as the "Mother of the Women's Club Movement in Kansas"; Kansas City
Dora Hand (1844–1878), dance hall singer, Dodge City
Wild Bill Hickok (1837–1876), lawman; Hays and Abilene
John James Ingalls (1833–1900), politician
Kris Kobach (born 1966), candidate for Governor in 2018, Kansas Secretary of State
James H. Lane (1814–1866), abolitionist, senator and union general; Lawrence
Bat Masterson (1853–1921), lawman; Dodge City
Carrie Nation (1846–1911), temperance activist; Medicine Lodge
Mary Bell Smith (1818-1894), organizer and first president, Kansas Woman's Christian Temperance Union

Crime

Fictional persons

See also

 Lists of people from Kansas

References 

Lists of people from Kansas